René Jean Albert Petitbon (18 August 1902 – 2 February 1965) was a French colonial administrator who served as Governor of French Polynesia and French Somaliland in the 1950s.

Biography
Petitbon was born in Pau in 1902. After earning a Bachelor of the Arts in 1923, he completed his military service between 1925 and 1926. He then taught in lycées in Saint-Étienne and Clermont-Ferrand until joining the Alsatian Bank Society in 1928. He became deputy director for the Haut-Rhin region in 1935 and then served as director general of the Banques Populaire of the North Paris region from 1937 until 1944.

A member of the resistance during the Nazi occupation, he was appointed prefect of Aube in 1944. The following year he relocated to Algeria to become prefect of Constantine, a role he held until 1949. He then became Inspector General of Administrative Affairs in  French West Africa. He was appointed Governor of French Polynesia in 1950, remaining in post until 1954 when he was appointed Governor of French Somaliland. He served in French Somaliland until 1957, and later worked in Algeria again between 1961 and 1962.

He died in Paris in 1965 at the age of 62.

References

1902 births
People from Pau, Pyrénées-Atlantiques
French educators
French bankers
French Resistance members
Prefects of Aube
Prefects of Constantine
People of French West Africa
Governors of French Polynesia
Colonial Governors of French Somaliland
1965 deaths